Boissevain is an unincorporated community, census-designated place (CDP), and former coal town in Tazewell County, Virginia, United States. It was defined as a census-designated place (then termed an unincorporated place) at the 1950 United States Census under the spelling Boissevaine, when it had a population of 1,197. It did not reappear again as a CDP until the 2020 census  with a population of 457.

Boissevain is served by the Abbs Valley -Boissevain - Pocahontas Rescue Squad Inc - Rescue 945 for Emergency Medical Services.

References

Coal towns in Virginia
Unincorporated communities in Tazewell County, Virginia
Unincorporated communities in Virginia
Census-designated places in Tazewell County, Virginia
Census-designated places in Virginia